Kim Dong-hyeon (born November 10, 1998), better known by his stage name Gree, is a South Korean rapper, singer, actor and television personality signed to Brand New Music.

Discography

Singles

Filmography

Film

Television series

Television shows

Web shows

Theater

Awards and nominations

Notes

References

External links
 
 

1998 births
Living people
K-pop singers
South Korean male rappers
South Korean hip hop singers
South Korean child singers
South Korean male child actors
South Korean male television actors
South Korean male voice actors
South Korean television presenters
People from Gimpo
Brand New Music artists
21st-century South Korean male  singers
Andong Kim clan